Bruno Echagaray (born 8 May 1983 in Mexico City) is a former Mexican tennis player.

He was the most known Mexican tennis player in 2006. He reached as high as 156 in the world for singles, and 162 for doubles. Most of his wins came on carpet, mostly because of his speed. He played a lot in the Davis Cup for Mexico.

Junior Grand Slam finals

Doubles: 1 (1 runner-up)

ATP Challenger and ITF Futures finals

Singles: 20 (6–14)

Doubles: 37 (22–15)

External links
 
 

1983 births
Living people
Mexican male tennis players
Tennis players from Mexico City
Central American and Caribbean Games medalists in tennis
Central American and Caribbean Games gold medalists for Mexico
21st-century Mexican people